The Jhargram Raj Palace is the current residence of the Malla Deb Royal family. Situated in Jhargram district, West Bengal. About 10 rooms on the ground floor have been converted into a Heritage Hotel run by the family.

History
Jhargram Raj was founded around 1592 AD by Sarveshwar Singh who along with his elder brother who were Generals under Man Singh of Amer and came to conquer Bengal when Emperor Akbar granted Subehdari of Bengal, Bihar and Orissa to Raja Man Singh. Sarveshwar Singh belonged to the Chauhan clan of Rajputs from Fatehpur Sikri. He defeated and vanquished the local Mal tribal kings who were ruling the region known as Junglekhand, even today in order to commemorate this victory, every year an idol of Mal Raja is made and slain on Vijayadashami day. As a reward, Raja Man Singh, granted mansabdari of the entire region of Junglekhand to his victorious generals Sarveshwar Singh Chauhan and his elder brother, under suzerainty and subordination as a tributary vassal state to the Mughal Emperor Akbar. He named his capital Jhargram which means 'a village surrounded by deep forests', hence the rulers of Jhargram assumed the title "Malla Deb".
In 1799, the ruler of Jhargram, revolted against the East India Company along with rulers of Bishnupur and others and the revolt was termed as Chuar Mutiny. The ruler was forced to surrender and the status Jhargram kingdom made to a Zamindari estate under the British authority. The kingdom had eight sardars under the system and one Sub Zamindar of Beliaberah.
The royal family ruled their dominions and estates from Jhargram Palace. The kingdom had its golden era during the reign of Raja Narasingha Malla Deb, under the guidance of his mentor and Dewan Rai Bahadur Debendra Mohan Bhattacharya, he developed Jhargram town into a modern planned township and commissioned the new Palace in 1931 which is one of the finest example of Indo Saracenic architecture in Eastern India and spread over 30 acres.

Architecture
The Main Building is impressive. The Jhargram Raj Palace is an opulent Italianate structure, set in carefully laid lawns and gardens. The Palace was restructured in 1931 CE, by the Calcutta Improvement Trust during the reign of Raja Narasingha Malla Deb Bahadur. In the Palace campus, so evocative of a regal lifestyle, the past comes alive.

The Palatial Guest House is a part of the Jhargram Raj Palace it has been a host to several dignitaries right from its inception some of the dignitaries who have officially stayed in this building as per the records are:
Lord Willingdon, the British Viceroy of India;
Sir John Arthur Herbert, the Governor of Bengal;
Lord Richard Casey, the Governor of Bengal;
Chakravarti Rajagopalachari;
Prafulla Chandra Ghosh;
Bidhan Chandra Ray ;
Lal Bahadur Shastri ;
Morarji Desai ;
General Cariappa;
Uttam Kumar;
Saiyid Nurul Hasan;
Pranab Mukherjee;
Mamata Banerjee

Heritage tourism
The proprietors of Jhargram Palace have developed a hotel and other tourism infrastructures in and around the palace which is boosting tourism in West Bengal.

Transport
Jhargram lies on AH46 which is a part of the Asian Highway Network. For local transportation bus, taxi, minibus, cycle-rikshaws, and autos are available. Jhargram is also connected by train to nearest big city like Kolkata, Tatanagar and Ranchi.
The nearest airport is Netaji Subhash Chandra Bose International Airport of Kolkata 155 km (by train) and 169 km (by road- AH46).Sonari Airport of Jamshedpur is located at a distance 96 km by train. Birsa Munda Airport of Ranchi is located at a distance of 233 km (by road- NH-33) and 258 km (by train).

See also
 Jhargram Raj
 Narasingha Malla Deb
 Jhargram Raj College

References

External links 

Palaces in West Bengal
Heritage hotels in India
Hotels in West Bengal
Tourist attractions in Jhargram district
Royal residences in India
Italianate architecture in India